Arthur and Leontine (Czech: Artur a Leontýna) is a 1940 Czech comedy film directed by Miroslav Josef Krnanský and starring Jiří Dohnal, Lída Baarová and František Smolík.

The film's sets were designed by the art director Jan Zázvorka.

It was made during the German occupation of Czechoslovakia.

Plot
A wealthy playboy leads an irresponsible life until he meets an attractive and hard-working woman who leads him to transform his ways.

Main cast
 Jiří Dohnal as Artur Drmola  
 Lída Baarová as Leontýna Sobotová  
 František Smolík as Jakub Drmola  
 Zdeňka Baldová as Márinka Drmolová  
 Theodor Pištěk as Alexandr Sobota  
 Jaromíra Pacová as Sobotová  
 Zita Kabátová as Klárka  
 Bedřich Veverka as Bohousek  
 Josef Gruss as Karel  
 Stella Májová as Dolfi  
 František Paul as Procurist  
 Hermína Vojtová as Fanynka  
 Marie Norrová as Katynka  
 Václav Trégl as Karásek, servant  
 František Kovařík as Fidrmuc  
 Vlasta Hrubá as Terinka  
 František Černý as Speaker

References

Bibliography 
 Bock, Hans-Michael & Bergfelder, Tim. The Concise CineGraph. Encyclopedia of German Cinema. Berghahn Books, 2009.
 Burianová Miroslava. Móda v ulicích protektorátu. Grada Publishing, 2013.

External links 
 

1940 films
Czech comedy films
1940 comedy films
1940s Czech-language films
Films directed by Miroslav Josef Krnanský
Czech black-and-white films
1940s Czech films